Maxim Zhestkov is a London-based digital artist and designer. His significant style includes using spheres as a universal medium that represents blocks in complex structures, such as 'emotions, behaviors, thought processes, relationships, life, planets and the universe.'

Early life and education 
Born and raised in Ulyanovsk, Maxim got into digital illustration and video games as a child. He studied architecture and graphic design at Ulyanovsk State University.

Work 
As a designer, Zhestkov worked on commissions for Google, Ford, Microsoft, Adobe, MTV, Nokia, Adidas, UEFA, BMW.

In his art practice, he aims to 'create a universal visual language that combines design, architecture, and computer graphics.' Using realistic digital simulations that are based on real-world physics, Zhestkov explores algorithms made by nature and humanity.

In his work, the artist imagines different scenarios of the future, such as computing devices integrated into architecture in his film Computations or artificial intelligence controlling its own evolution in Artificial Organisms. Another theme present in his oeuvre is the examination of natural forces and patterns.

Screenings and exhibitions 

 Nassima Landau, 2022
 Kunsthalle Zurich, 2022
 Unit London, 2021
 Contemporary Istanbul, 2021
 Cosmoscow, 2021
 Hermitage Museum, 2019
 Aranya Art Center, 2019
Chi K11 Art Museum, 2019
 Ars Electronica Festival, 2018

References 

1985 births
Living people